The Federal Ministry of Women Affairs and Social Development is a part of the Federal Ministries of Nigeria that promotes the development of women and children in Nigeria. The ministry is currently headed by Pauline Tallen, a former Deputy Governor of Plateau State.

Organisation 
The ministry is headed by a Minister appointed by the President, assisted by a Permanent Secretary, who is a career civil servant.

Objectives include stimulating action to promote civic, political, social and economic participation of women; coordinating and monitoring women's programmes; providing technical and financial support to women Non-governmental organizations, especially the National Council of Women Societies.

Functions 
The Ministry of Women Affairs is required to review substantive and procedural laws that affect women. Some activities undertaken by the Ministry include cottage industry projects such as bee-keeping, pottery and vegetable oil production to boost the economic empowerment of women, where the Ministry provides equipment and training to women's cooperatives. 

The Ministry also promotes literacy and health programs for women.
In December 2007, the ministry issued a policy for addressing HIV/AIDS in the workplace, helping ensure prevention, care and support for those living with the disease.

List of ministers

See also
Nigerian Civil Service
Federal Ministries of Nigeria

References

External links 
 Official homepage

Federal Ministries of Nigeria
Women's rights in Nigeria
Women's ministries